The 1982–83 New Jersey Nets season was the Nets' seventh season in the NBA. With 49 wins and 33 losses, it was also their best record since the ABA–NBA merger—a mark that would stand until the 2001–02 season.

Draft picks

Roster

Regular season

Season standings

z – clinched division title
y – clinched division title
x – clinched playoff spot

Record vs. opponents

Game log

Playoffs

|- align="center" bgcolor="#ffcccc"
| 1
| April 20
| New York
| L 107–118
| Albert King (17)
| Buck Williams (13)
| Cook, Birdsong (6)
| Brendan Byrne Arena15,672
| 0–1
|- align="center" bgcolor="#ffcccc"
| 2
| April 21
| @ New York
| L 99–105
| Albert King (25)
| Buck Williams (10)
| Foots Walker (6)
| Madison Square Garden19,591
| 0–2
|-

Player statistics

Season

Playoffs

Awards and records
 Buck Williams, All-NBA Second Team

Transactions

References

See also
 1982–83 NBA season

New Jersey Nets season
New Jersey Nets seasons
New Jersey Nets
New Jersey Nets
20th century in East Rutherford, New Jersey
Meadowlands Sports Complex